The K-Type is a family of inline-4 automobile engines developed and produced by Renault since 1995. This is an internal combustion engine, four-stroke, with 4 cylinders in line bored directly into the iron block, water cooled, with tree (s) driven overhead camshafts driven by a toothed timing belt and an aluminium cylinder head. This engine is available in petrol and diesel versions, with 8 or 16 valves.

History
The K-Type engine is an evolution of the Energy engine, itself derived from the Cléon-Fonte engine in which a hemispherical head incorporating a camshaft driven by a toothed timing belt was fitted. The K-Type engine is the ultimate evolution of the Cléon-Fonte engine. The main modification of the K-Type engine is the use of non-removable cylinder liners.

Evolution

Gasoline versions
In 1998, a 16-valve derivative of the K7M engine appeared in the Renault Laguna Phase 2, named the K4M. This new engine replaced the 1.8 litre F-Type engine fitted to the Laguna Phase 1.

The specificity of K4J and K4M engines is that they have a 16-valve cylinder head, similar to the F4P and F4R versions of F-Type engine, over the K4J and K4M engines share the same distribution kit and even water pump that the F-Type engine 16 valves (F4P and F4R).

Diesel versions
The K9K engine - diesel version with  - appeared on the Clio 2 Phase 2, to replace the 1.9 D ("F-Type engine"). This engine is equipped with high-pressure direct injection common-rail.

KxJ petrol engine
The KxJ displaces . It is an evolution from Renault Energy ExJ.

Applications (K7J 8v)

Starting 2011 Dacia replaced the old KxJ with Euro 5 1.0 (16 valves), 1.2 (16 valves) and 1.6-litre engines.

Applications (K4J 16v)

KxM petrol engine
The KxM engine has a displacement of  featuring multi-point fuel injection and EGR emission control system fitted.

Applications (K7M 8v)

Applications (K4M 16v)

K9K dCi

The K9K is an automobile engine family – a group of straight-4 8-valve turbocharged Diesel engines co-developed by Nissan and/or Renault, and also Daimler AG (where it is called OM607). The turbochargers used with this engine are provided by Garrett and BorgWarner. It has a displacement of 1461 cc and is called 1.5 dCi (direct Common-rail injection). The Delphi injection systems have been replaced with Bosch ones in the Euro 5 versions.

There are three versions of this engine: a low power version, a high power version and a high power version with variable-geometry turbocharger. Their maximum power output varies depending on the emission standards they meet.

The engine has been in production since 2001, with over 10 million units sold as of April 2013. Improvements over this period have included coating the tappets to reduce friction by 40%; redesigning the injector spray angle, resulting in a 15% reduction of  during combustion and a small improvement in torque; and fitting new piston rings, reducing the tension on the belt-driving engine accessories and optimizing the dimensions of the base engine. The injection pattern has been altered to have two pilot injections over a wide operating range, reducing combustion noise by up to 3 decibels. Still newer technology also includes using a variable-pressure oil pump, and adding stop/start battery technology and low-pressure exhaust-gas recirculation. The K9K engine is produced in Bursa, Turkey; Chennai, India; and Valladolid, Spain. Emissions-wise, it emits as little /km of carbon dioxide.

Applications

See also
Renault R-Type engine
List of Renault engines
List of PSA engines
Nissan HR engine
Renault–Nissan Alliance

References

K
Gasoline engines by model
Diesel engines by model
Straight-four engines